Hymnal is an album by Hwyl Nofio.

Track listing
"A brutality of fact" 
"All you knew were doomed" 
"Children are" 
"Spirits" 
"Disciples of the decibel (part 1)" 
"Head Eater" 
"Hymnal" 
"Holy Ghosts"

Personnel
Steve Parry: guitar, prepared piano, tapes, keyboards, percussion, ebow, church organ, effects, harmonium, cello
Trevor Stainsby: effects, programming, mix
Fredrik Soegaard: fractal guitar
Sandor Szabo: ambimorph guitar 
Balazs Major: percussion, drums 
Mark Beazley: from the band Rothko): bass 
Tim Crawley: prepared piano
The Jerusalem Brass Band: brass

References

External links

Hwyl Nofio albums
2002 albums